The One Hundred Twenty-ninth Ohio General Assembly was a meeting of the Ohio state legislature, composed of the Ohio State Senate and the Ohio House of Representatives.  It met in Columbus, Ohio from January 3, 2011 until December 20, 2012.  While Ted Strickland was Ohio Governor for the first week of the biennium, John Kasich was sworn in during the second week.  The apportionment of districts was based on the 2000 United States census.  This was the last time the 2000 census was used by the General Assembly to determine the apportionment of legislative districts.  While the Ohio Senate was retained by the Ohio Republican Party, they won control of the Ohio House of Representatives from the Ohio Democratic Party.

Major legislation

Enacted
February 18, 2011: JobsOhio: Privatization of Development Department
March 30, 2011: Ohio Biennium Transportation Budget 2012–2013
March 31, 2011: Collective Bargaining Reform for Public Employees

Party summary
Resignations and new members are discussed in the "Changes in membership" section, below.

Senate

House of Representatives

Leadership

Senate
Senate President: Tom Niehaus
President Pro Tempore: Keith Faber

Majority (Republican) leadership
Majority Floor Leader: Jimmy Stewart
Majority Whip: Shannon Jones

Minority (Democratic) leadership
Senate Minority Leader: Capri Cafaro
Assistant Minority Leader: Shirley Smith
Minority Whip: Edna Brown
Assistant Minority Whip: Jason Wilson

House of Representatives
Speaker of the House: William G. Batchelder
Speaker Pro Tempore: Lou Blessing

Majority (Republican) leadership
Majority Floor Leader: Matt Huffman
Assistant Majority Floor Leader: Barbara Sears
Majority Whip: John Adams
Assistant Majority Whip: Cheryl Grossman

Minority (Democratic) leadership
 House Minority Leader: Armond Budish
Assistant Minority Leader: Matt Szollosi
Minority Whip: Tracy Maxwell Heard
Assistant Minority Whip: Debbie Phillips

Membership

Senate

House of Representatives

Changes in membership

Senate

House of Representatives

See also
 List of Ohio state legislatures

References

External links
Ohio House of Representatives official website
Project Vote Smart – State House of Ohio
Map of Ohio House Districts
Ohio District Maps 2002–2012
2006 election results from Ohio Secretary of State

Ohio legislative sessions
2011 in Ohio
2012 in Ohio
2011 U.S. legislative sessions
2012 U.S. legislative sessions